Friedrich Gnaß (13 November 1892 – 8 May 1958) was a German film actor. He appeared in 53 films between 1929 and 1958.

Partial filmography

 Beyond the Street (1929) - Der Matrose / The Sailor
 Mother Krause's Journey to Happiness (1929) - Max
 Revolt in the Reformatory (1930)
 Troika (1930) - Stephan, troika driver
 Danton (1931) - Sanson
 Fra Diavolo (1931) - Rodomonte
 M (1931) - Franz
 Kameradschaft (1931) - Fritz - Rescue Volunteer
 Louise, Queen of Prussia (1931)
 Rasputin, Demon with Women (1932) - Derewenko
 Raid in St. Pauli (1932) - Karl the Sailor
 I by Day, You by Night (1932) - Helmut
 Morgenrot (1933) - Juraczik
 The Star of Valencia (1933) - Diego
 Refugees (1933) - Hussar
 Achtung! Wer kennt diese Frau? (1934) - Carlo Fiori
 Abenteuer eines jungen Herrn in Polen (1934) - Prisoner
 Blood Brothers (1935)
 Hundert Tage (1935) - Ney
 Henker, Frauen und Soldaten (1935)
 Travelling People (1938) - Bosko
 Secret Code LB 17 (1938) - Ein Telefonist der Aufständigen
 Capriccio (1938) - Erster Hahnenkämpfer
 Nordlicht (1938) - Lappen-Nils
 The Green Hell (1938) - Antonio, ein Vaquero
 Sergeant Berry (1938) - Duffy (uncredited)
 Pour le Mérite (1938) - Herr Holzapfel
 Uproar in Damascus (1939) - Funker Gerlach
 Legion Condor (1939)
 Wozzeck (1947) - Spießrutenläufer
 Die Buntkarierten (1949) - Großvater
 The Beaver Coat (1949) - Julius Wolff
 Our Daily Bread (1949) - Albrecht
 The Benthin Family (1950) - Arbeiter im Demontagewerk
 Der Untertan (1951) - Napoleon Fischer
 Story of a Young Couple (1952) - Hotelportier
 The Condemned Village (1952) - Bauer Scheffler
 Shadow Over the Islands (1952) - Bredeholm
 Frauenschicksale (1952) - Karl Neumann
 Anna Susanna (1953) - Fietjes Vater
 Die Geschichte vom kleinen Muck (1953) - Stadtwächter
 Ernst Thälmann (1954) - Hauswirt
 Leuchtfeuer (1954) - Alter Mann mit Prothese
 Wer seine Frau lieb hat (1955) - Dörr
 Once Is Never (1955) - Hunzele
 Spielbank-Affäre (1957) - Betrunkener
 Katzgraben (1957) - Kleinschmidt, ein Kleinbauer
 Spur in die Nacht (1957) - Der alte Grabbert
 Der Fackelträger (1957) - Kabische
 Gejagt bis zum Morgen (1957) - Vater Baumann
 Die Schönste (1957)
 Escape from Sahara (1958) - Germanini

References

External links

1892 births
1958 deaths
German male film actors
20th-century German male actors
People from Bochum